Daniel Newnan (1780 – January 16, 1851) was an American politician and military commander in North Carolina and Georgia.

Early years and education
Born in Salisbury, North Carolina in 1780, Newnan attended the University of North Carolina at Chapel Hill in 1796 and 1797.

Military career
He was commissioned as an ensign and second lieutenant in the Fourth United States Infantry on March 3, 1799, promoted to first lieutenant the following November and resigned on January 1, 1801.

Newnan was adjutant general of Georgia from 1806 to 1817. In June 1812 Newnan (with the rank of Colonel) led two dragoons and 250 infantry of the Georgia militia to join the Patriot Army in Florida. The Patriot Army was a group of American adventurers, primarily from Georgia, that was attempting to seize Spanish Florida. Newnan led an expedition into the interior of Florida in September to find and punish Seminoles who had attacked the Americans in Florida. His force consisted of 117 men, only 78 of whom were from the Georgia militia (the others had refused to extend their short-term enlistments). Newnan's company unexpectedly encountered a band of Alachua Seminoles led by King Payne. The ensuing battle quickly became a stalemate, and Newnan's force was pinned down for nine days before withdrawing. During the Creek War, Newnan commanded a group of Georgia Volunteers; he fought the British at the Battle of Fort Peter.

Post war years
After the war, he lived on a plantation near McDonough, Georgia. He was commissioned a major general over the third division of the Georgia Militia in 1817.

Public office
From 1823 to 1824, Newnan was the superintendent of the Georgia State Penitentiary and from 1825 to 1827, he served as the Secretary of State of Georgia. Newnan was elected as a Jacksonian Democrat and Representative of Georgia to the 22nd United States Congress and served one term from March 4, 1831, until March 3, 1833. He was not reelected.

Death and legacy
He died near Rossville, Georgia, on January 16, 1851, and was buried at Newnan Springs Cemetery in Catoosa County, Georgia.

The city of Newnan, Georgia was named in his honor in 1828. Newnan's Lake and the former town of Newnansville, both in Alachua County, Florida, are named after Colonel Newnan.

Notes

References

 Smith, Gordon Burns, History of the Georgia Militia, 1783-1861, Volume One, Campaigns and Generals, Boyd Publishing, 2000.

External links
 

1851 deaths
Secretaries of State of Georgia (U.S. state)
Georgia (U.S. state) Democrats
United States Army officers
People of the Creek War
Georgia (U.S. state) militia
Year of birth uncertain
1780 births
Jacksonian members of the United States House of Representatives from Georgia (U.S. state)
People from Salisbury, North Carolina
People from Henry County, Georgia
American slave owners
19th-century American politicians